Neuroectoderm (or neural ectoderm or neural tube epithelium) consists of cells derived from ectoderm. Formation of the neuroectoderm is first step in the development of the nervous system. The neuroectoderm receives bone morphogenetic protein-inhibiting signals from proteins such as noggin, which leads to the development of the nervous system from this tissue. Histologically, these cells are classified as pseudostratified columnar cells.

After recruitment from the ectoderm, the neuroectoderm undergoes three stages of development: transformation into the neural plate, transformation into the neural groove (with associated neural folds), and transformation into the neural tube.  After formation of the tube, the brain forms into three sections; the hindbrain, the midbrain, and the forebrain.

The types of neuroectoderm include:
Neural crest
pigment cells in the skin
ganglia of the autonomic nervous system
dorsal root ganglia.
facial cartilage 
aorticopulmonary septum of the developing heart and lungs
ciliary body of the eye
adrenal medulla
Neural tube
brain (rhombencephalon, mesencephalon and prosencephalon)
spinal cord and motor neurons
retina
posterior pituitary

See also
 Neural plate
 Neuroectodermal neoplasm
 Neuroepithelial cell

References

External links
 
 https://web.archive.org/web/20070904031943/http://sprojects.mmi.mcgill.ca/embryology/earlydev/week3/neurulation.html
 http://www.med.umich.edu/lrc/coursepages/M1/embryology/embryo/08nervoussystem.htm

Embryology of nervous system
Ectoderm